Oberea scutellaris is a species of beetle in the family Cerambycidae. It was described by Carl Eduard Adolph Gerstaecker in 1855.

References

Beetles described in 1855
scutellaris